Yahya Abdallah al-Ubaydi was an Iraqi politician and leader of the Arab Socialist Ba'ath Party. He was responsible for the organizations of Basra province.

After the 2003 invasion
His name was included in the list of Iraqis wanted by the United States, and he appeared in a deck of playing cards for the most wanted Iraqis, and he is still a fugitive or missing, but he is believed to have been killed during the invasion of Iraq.

In 2017, the Iraqi Council of Representatives passed a law providing for the confiscation of movable and immovable funds for each of Saddam Hussein, his wives, children, grandchildren, relatives up to the second degree and their agents, and the confiscation of existing funds from 52 members of the former regime, among whom was Yahya Abdullah al-Aboudi.

References

External links

2003 deaths
Members of the Regional Command of the Arab Socialist Ba'ath Party – Iraq Region
Most-wanted Iraqi playing cards